Ariane was a 40-gun frigate of the French Navy, lead ship of her class.

Career 
Ariane was commissioned on 9 January 1812 under Captain Jean-Baptiste-Henri Féretier.

They made a cartel of Patent, putting their British prisoners aboard her; she arrived at Plymouth on 24 May. The American prisoners the French put on Woodrop, which they sent to America.
 
Returning to Lorient, the squadron met the British 74-gun ship-of-the-line , Captain Henry Hotham. In the ensuing action of 22 May 1812, the two frigates ran aground trying to escape their much stronger opponent; their crews set them afire to prevent the frigates's capture.

See also
List of French sail frigates

Citations

References

Age of Sail frigates of France
Ships built in France
1811 ships
Ariane-class frigates
Maritime incidents in 1812
Scuttled vessels